Telurips is a genus of moths belonging to the family Tortricidae.

Species
Telurips dubius Razowski & Wojtusiak, 2010
Telurips peruvianus Razowski, 1988

See also
List of Tortricidae genera

References

 , 1988, Acta zoologica cracoviensia 31: 390.
 , 2005, World Catalogue of Insects 5
 , 2010: Tortricidae (Lepidoptera) from Peru. Acta Zoologica Cracoviensia 53B (1-2): 73-159. . Full article: .

External links
tortricidae.com

Euliini
Tortricidae genera